Sonnenschiff is a large integrated office and retail building in Freiburg im Breisgau, Germany. It was built in 2004 in the city's Vauban quarter as part of the Solar Settlement at Schlierberg. Sonnenschiff was designed by the architect Rolf Disch (who also built the Heliotrope building) and generates four times more energy than it uses.

As a whole this building produces more energy than it consumes per year and utilizes the most up-to-date building technology. Some aspects that make this building particular are its vacuum insulated walls, ventilation with 95% heat recovery, triple paned windows and its energy façade.

It is the first positive energy office building worldwide. The office spaces are flanked on both the East and West sides entirely with windows, which maximizes natural lighting and employee views while it minimizes the energy used for artificial lighting.

Sonnenschiff includes a supermarket, convenience store and bakery-café on the first floor, offices and work spaces on the 2-4 floors and 9 penthouses on its roof. In addition to the office and retail space, there are two conference rooms.

Design
This steel-framed construction is called the "Sun Ship" as its skyline resembles the silhouette of a ship.

Its design allows it to naturally stay cool in the summer and to store heat in the winter.

The ground floor is used for high-end retail and commercial space.  The next three floors are used as office and commercial space, while nine penthouses on its rooftop offer residential space (112 to 300 sq. meters).  This unique integration of retail, commercial and residential space, all with a carbon-free footprint and a positive energy balance distinguish this development.

Residents
Apart from the nine penthouses, Sonnenschiff houses several companies such as the high-end supermarket Alnatura, a DM drug store and such institutions as Ökostrom and the non-profit Öko-Institut.

PlusEnergy
PlusEnergy is a term coined by Rolf Disch that indicates a structure’s extreme energy efficiency so that it holds a positive energy balance, actually producing more energy than it uses. With the completion of his private residence, the Heliotrope, in 1994, Disch had created the first PlusEnergy house. His next goal in its development was thus the mass application of the concept to residential, commercial and retail space.  As the concept further developed and gained financial backing as well, Disch built several more projects with PlusEnergy certifications. “PlusEnergy is a fundamental environmental imperative,” Disch claimed.  Disch believes that passive building is not enough because passive homes still emit CO2 into the atmosphere.

Awards

2008 German Sustainability Award
2007-08 Japanese PEN-Magazine Creativity Award
2006 Germany's most beautiful housing community
2005 Wuppertal Energy and Environment Prize
2003 Global Energy Award
2002 European Solar Prize

See also

 Sustainable architecture
 Passive solar design
 Anti-nuclear movement in Germany
 Green building
 Zero-energy building

References

External links
Architect's page on the subject.
Official Sonnenschiff website (in German)
 Solar Settlement and Sun Ship Video
 PlusEnergy
Freshome.com: brief description with pictures
Article in Chinese with some pictures of the house 

Freiburg (region)
Buildings and structures in Freiburg im Breisgau
Solar architecture
Solar design
Sustainable building
Office buildings in Germany
Solar energy in Germany